Bernabeu or Bernabéu is a Valencian surname, derived from Barnabas, ultimately derived from the Aramaic Bar Nebuah.

Notable people with this surname include:
 Almudena Bernabeu, Spanish attorney
 David Bernabeu (born 1975), Spanish cyclist
 Iker Pajares Bernabeu (born 1996), Spanish squash player
 Manuel Bernabeu (born 1920), Spanish pentathlete
 María Bernabéu (born 1988), Spanish judoka
 Santiago Bernabéu (footballer) (1895–1978), Spanish footballer
 Tomas Eduardo Bernabeu Morato (1887–1965), Filipino businessman

See also
 Santiago Bernabéu Stadium, Madrid, often referred to in English as Bernabeu or the Bernabeu

References

Catalan-language surnames